Santo Domingo de Guzmán (in Nawat: Witzapan) is a municipality in the Sonsonate department of El Salvador.

Small municipality at the border between Ahuachapan and Sonsonate Departments.

References 

Municipalities of the Sonsonate Department